Seke may refer to:
 Seke language (Nepal), a Sino-Tibetan language related to Thakali
 Seke language (Vanuatu) or Ske, an Oceanic language of Pentecost Island
 Seke District, a district in Mashonaland East, Zimbabwe
 Seke Rural, a parliamentary constituency in Zimbabwe
 SEKE, a former name of the Communist Party of Greece

See also
 Seki language or Sheke, a Bantu language of Equatorial Guinea and Gabon
 Seke-Banza, a community in the Democratic Republic of the Congo